Sarah Elias (born 31 December 1996) is a Luxembourgish footballer who plays as a defender and has appeared for the Luxembourg women's national team.

Career
Elias has been capped for the Luxembourg national team, appearing for the team during the 2019 FIFA Women's World Cup qualifying cycle.

References

External links
 
 
 

1996 births
Living people
Luxembourgian women's footballers
Luxembourg women's international footballers
Women's association football defenders